Limitless is an EP by American metalcore band Crown the Empire. It was self-released on November 29, 2011 and was  produced by the band themselves.

Track listing

Personnel 
Crown the Empire
 Andrew "Andy Leo" Rockhold – lead vocals
 Bennett "Benn Suede" Vogelman – lead guitar, backing vocals
 Brandon Hoover – rhythm guitar, backing vocals
 Hayden Tree – bass
 Brent Taddie – drums, percussion
 Austin Duncan – keyboards, programming

Additional musicians
 Britni Michelle Horner – guest vocals on "Voices"
 Denis Stoff – guest vocals on "Limitless"

Additional personnel
 Crown the Empire – production

References 

2011 EPs
Crown the Empire albums